Yescarly Medina is a Venezuelan Paralympic athlete with cerebral palsy. She represented Venezuela at the 2016 Summer Paralympics held in Rio de Janeiro, Brazil and she won the bronze medal in the 100 metres T37 event.

At the 2015 Parapan American Games held in Toronto, Canada, she won the gold medal in the women's 100 metres T37 event. At the 2019 Parapan American Games held in Lima, Peru, she won the bronze medal in that event.

References

External links 
 

Living people
1992 births
Sportspeople from Maracay
Venezuelan female sprinters
Track and field athletes with cerebral palsy
Athletes (track and field) at the 2016 Summer Paralympics
Medalists at the 2016 Summer Paralympics
Paralympic bronze medalists for Venezuela
Paralympic medalists in athletics (track and field)
Paralympic athletes of Venezuela
Medalists at the 2015 Parapan American Games
Medalists at the 2019 Parapan American Games
21st-century Venezuelan women